Patrice Ségura (born 24 May 1961) is a French former professional football player and manager.

Playing career 
Ségura was a product from Toulouse's academy. He made his first appearances for Les Violets during the 1981–82 season, in which the club won the Division 2 title. In 1983, he joined Sète. He scored a total of 17 goals in his single season at the club.

Ségura signed for Paris Saint-Germain in 1984, and made his first appearance in a 4–1 loss to Monaco on 14 May 1985. He scored his first and only goal for PSG in a 2–0 win against his former club Toulouse in the Coupe de France semi-finals on 4 June. Ségura's final match for Les Parisiens would eventually be the 1–0 loss in to Monaco in the cup final four days later.

When Ségura left PSG, he joined Laval. He continued his career at Amiens, Lorient, and Saint-Pierroise before hanging up his boots.

Managerial career 
After retiring from football, Ségura went on to manage three clubs in Réunion: Jeanne d'Arc, La Tamponnaise, and his former side Saint-Pierroise.

Career statistics

Honours 
Toulouse

 Division 2: 1981–82

Paris Saint-Germain

 Coupe de France runner-up: 1984–85

References 

1961 births
Living people
French footballers
French football managers
Sportspeople from Limoges
Association football forwards
Ligue 2 players
Ligue 1 players
Toulouse FC players
FC Sète 34 players
Paris Saint-Germain F.C. players

Stade Lavallois players
Amiens SC players
FC Lorient players
JS Saint-Pierroise players
Footballers from Nouvelle-Aquitaine